Noah Thomas Porter III (December 14, 1811 – March 4, 1892) was an American Congregational minister, academic, philosopher, author, lexicographer and an outspoken anti-slavery activist. Porter Mountain, of the Adirondack Mountains, was named for him after he was the first to climb it in 1875. He was President of Yale College (1871–1886).

Biography
He was born to Noah Porter Jr. (1781–1866) (one of the first ministers of First Church of Christ, Congregational in Farmington, Connecticut) and his wife, born Mehitable Meigs, in Farmington, Connecticut, on December 14, 1811. His younger sister was Sarah Porter, founder of Miss Porter's School, a college preparatory school for girls. He graduated in 1831 from Yale College, where he was a member of the Linonian Society. On April 13, 1836, in New Haven, he married Mary Taylor, daughter of Nathaniel Taylor (who presided over the creation of the Yale Divinity School and created what came to be known as "New Haven theology") and his wife Rebecca Marie Hine.  They had several children, and two daughters survived them.

He was ordained as a Congregational minister in New Milford, Connecticut, from 1836 to 1843. He served as pastor at a Congregational Church in Springfield, Massachusetts, from 1843 to 1846. He was elected professor of moral philosophy and metaphysics at Yale in 1846.

Porter was inaugurated as President of Yale College on Wednesday, October 11, 1871. He continued to serve as head of the college until 1886.

Porter edited several editions of Webster's Dictionary, and wrote on education.

Influenced by the German refugee writer and philosopher Francis Lieber, Porter opposed slavery and integrated an antislavery position with religious liberalism.

He was a frequent visitor to the Adirondack Mountains of New York, and in 1875 was among the first recorded to make an ascent of the peak later named Porter Mountain in his honor.

His best-known work is The Human Intellect, with an Introduction upon Psychology and the Human Soul (1868), comprehending a general history of philosophy, and following in part the "common-sense" philosophy of the Scottish school, while accepting the Kantian doctrine of intuition, and declaring the notion of design to be a priori. Of great importance were two other works, Elements of Intellectual Science (1871) and Elements of Moral Science (1885).

He died on March 4, 1892, in New Haven, and was buried in the Grove Street Cemetery there.

Notes

References
 Kelley, Brooks Mather. (1999).  Yale: A History. New Haven: Yale University Press. ;  OCLC 810552
 Levesque, George. “Noah Porter Revisited,” History of Higher Education Annual, 26 (2007), 29–66.
 Welch, Lewis Sheldon and Walter Camp. (1899).  Yale, Her Campus, Class-rooms, and Athletics. Boston: L. C. Page and Co.  OCLC 2191518

External links

Civil Liberty: A Sermon, from the Antislavery Literature Project
The Human Intellect: With an Introduction upon Psychology and the Soul via Google Books.
Peirce, C. S. (1869), "Professor Porter's Human Intellect" (review), The Nation 8, 211–13 (March 18, 1869). Peirce Edition Project Eprint.

1811 births
1892 deaths
Yale College alumni
Presidents of Yale University
People from Farmington, Connecticut
Burials at Grove Street Cemetery
American lexicographers
American philosophers
Burials in Connecticut
American Congregationalist ministers
19th-century American clergy
19th-century lexicographers